This is a list of Malaysian football transfers for the 2012 transfer window. Only moves featuring at least one team in the Malaysia Super League  and Malaysia Premier League is listed.

ATM FA

In

Out

Betaria FC

In

  Badrol Hanapi Ali from MP Muar FC
  M. Ravinthiran from MP Muar FC
  Mohd Fadhullah Yunfisar from MP Muar FC
  Muhd Shahrul Nizam Abdul Hamid from MP Muar FC
  Muhd Afiq Akhmal Zunaidi from MP Muar FC
  Nasrullah Hanif Johan from MP Muar FC
  L. Rajesh from MP Muar FC
  S. Harivarman from MP Muar FC
  Mohd Saufi Ibrahim from Johor FC
  Azrine Efendy Sa'duddin from Sime Darby FC
  P. Haresh from PKNS FC President's Cup Team
  N. Dhurai from PDRM FA
  C. Premnath from Penang FA
  Mohd Afendi Ishak from Johor FC President's Cup
  Mohd Amirul Rosli from Perlis FA
  Al Amin Abdullah from PBDKT T-Team FC President's Cup Team
  Mohd Fauzi Abdul Kadar from MP Muar FC
  Mohd Syafez Mohammad from Kedah President's Cup Team
  Adli Muhammad from MP Muar FC
  Mohd Nadzmeer Hisham from MP Muar FC
  Ammerrul Hisyam Amran from ATM FA
  Mohd Khairul Izzuwan Saari from MP Muar FC
  V. Darman Pandithan from Selangor FA
  S. Gregory Edward from Malacca FA
  Mohd Zaidee Jamalluddin from Pahang FA
  Mohd Azwan Mohd Nor from MP Muar FC

Out

  Ahmad Syahidan Abdul Mubin to Malacca FA
  Abdul Aziz Ismail to MP Muar FC
  Kamarul Zamil Baharom to MBJB FC
  Hanif Mohd Nor to Pos Malaysia FC
  Azari Dermaraju to Release
  Norfaizzal Faroq Zaharuddin to MP Muar FC
  Hardi Ahmad to Release
  Zool Ihsan Yunos to MP Muar FC
  Che Hisamuddin Hassan to Release
  Zainuddin Mohamed to Release
  G. Sivabalan to Release
  M. Anthony to Release
  Azlie Kidam to Release
  Mohd Hazeman Abdul Karim to Release
  Mohd Shahrul Shahzrin Hamid to Melodi Jaya Sports Club
  P. Sivanantham to Release
  Rudi Ezuan Omar to Release
  Mohd Hilmi Rosli to Release
  P. Sutharsan to Release
  M. Dinesh to Release
  Ng Choon Yiap to Release

Felda United FC

In

Out

Harimau Muda B
Transfers (In)

 

Transfers (Out)

Johor FA

Transfers (In)

 

Transfers (Out)

Johor FC

In

Out

MBJB FC

In

Kedah FA

Transfers (In)

Transfers (Out)

Kelantan FA

Transfers (In)

Transfers (Out)

Kuala Lumpur FA

In

Out

Malacca FA

In

  M. Tamilselvam from MP Muar FC
  Mohd Jailani Abdullah from MP Muar FC
  Muhammad Munawwar Shavukath Ali from Perlis FA
  Ahmad Syahidan Abdul Mubin from Betaria FC
  S. Sadesh Kumar from MP Muar FC
  J. Thevaggaran Nair from MP Muar FC
  Mohd Fhadzil bin Mohd Limin from Rapid KL FC
  Zailan bin Mohamad from MP Muar FC
  Nik Shahrul Anizan bin Mohammad from Perlis FA
  B. Thangaraju promote from Malacca FA President's Cup Team
  R. Vishnu Nair promote from Malacca FA President's Cup Team
  R. Nandakopal from MP Muar FC
  Mohamad Akbar bin Khamis from Selangor FA President's Cup Team
  Mohamad Hafif Azhar from Selangor FA President's Cup Team
  Badrul Hisyam Mohamad from Selangor FA President's Cup Team
  Mohd Zarul Nazmie from ATM FA
  Khairul Efsan Mat Isa from PKNS FC

Out

  Azuan Othman to Release
  Rozaidey Othman to Release
  Normizal Ismail to Release
  Zakaria Abdul Karim to Release
  Mohd Samsudin Senin to Release
  Mohd Nor Dani to Release
  Ahmad Kamal Jamallul Rahman to Perlis FA
  M. Ragu to Release
  Muhammad Hafifi Hafiz Baharom to Release
  Mohd Helme Leman to Release
  Muhammad Hafiz Mustaffa Bakri to Release
  Mohd Yusri Mustafa to SDMS Kepala Batas FC
  Rahim Abu Bakar to Release
  Abdul Zaini Abdullah to Release
  Mohd Shahareen Abdullah to MBJB FC
  Khairul Anwar Shahrudin to MP Muar FC
  Muhd Hanafiah Abu Bakar to MP Muar FC
  Abidul Qahhar Roslan to MP Muar FC
  Ramzi Haziq Mohamad to Johor FA
  Ahmad Khuzaimie Piee to MP Muar FC
  Ammer Syafiq Abdul Rahman to MP Muar FC
  Mohd Azarol Aidil Razmay to MP Muar FC
  Mohd Nizam Yusri to MP Muar FC
  Saiful Nizam Mohd Yassin to MP Muar FC
  A. Jagen Jayaraj to Melodi Jaya Sports Club
  Hazril Here to Johor FC
  S. Gregory Edward to Betaria FC
  N. Thirushilvan to Melodi Jaya Sports Club

MP Muar FC

Transfers (In)

 

Transfers (Out)

Negeri Sembilan FA

Transfers (In)

Transfers (Out)

Pahang FA
2012 Transfers (In)

2012 Transfers (Out)

PBDKT T-Team FC

Transfers (In)

Transfers (Out)

PDRM FA
Transfers (In)

 

Transfers (Out)

Penang FA

Transfers (In)

 

Transfers (Out)

Perak FA

In

Out

PBAPP FC

Transfers (In)

Perlis FA

Transfers (In)

 

   April Transfer
  April Transfer
  April Transfer
  April Transfer
  April Transfer
  April Transfer
  April Transfer
  April Transfer
  April Transfer
  April Transfer
   April Transfer

Transfers (Out)

PKNS FC
Transfers (In)

 

Transfers (Out)

Pos Malaysia FC
Transfers (In)

Transfers (Out)

Rapid KL FC

Out

Sabah FA

In

Out

Sarawak FA

In

Out

SDMS Kepala Batas FC

In

Out

Selangor FA

Transfers (In)

Transfers (Out)

Shahzan Muda FC

Transfers (In)

Transfers (Out)

Sime Darby F.C.

In

  Patrick Wleh from LISCR F.C.
  Mohd Fadly Baharum from Perlis FA
  Razali Umar Kandasamy from Perak FA
  Mohd Asyraf Al-Japri from Johor FA
  Muhd Arif Ismail from Perak FA
  Mohammad Zamri Hassan from PKNS FC
  Mohd Irme Mat from PKNS FC
  Hairul Nizam Haniff from PKNS FC
  Mohd Shoufiq Mohamad Kusaini from Johor FA
  Rosli Muda from PBDKT T-Team FC
  Mohd Shazlan Alias from PBDKT T-Team FC
  Mohd Asrol Ibrahim from UiTM FC
  Azmirul Azmi promote from Sime Darby FC President's Cup Team
  Muhammad Syafizullah Abdul Wahab from Selangor FA
  Muhd Fitri Kamal from Penang FA
  K. Prabakaran from Selangor FA
  A. Puvanarajah from Selangor FA
  Mohd Hafizan Talib from Terengganu FA
  M. Ganeswaran from Kuala Lumpur FA
  Mohd Ikram Ibrahim from SDMS Kepala Batas FC

Out

  S. Muneswaran to Malacca FA President's Cup Team
  S. Kalai Arasu to Perak FA President's Cup Team
  Ahmad Bukhari Ahmad Termizi to MP Muar FC President's Cup Team
  Wan Mohd Aiman Wan Rafiee to MBJB FC
  Nik Yus Saiddatul to Sabah FA President's Cup Team
  Mohd Saiful Mustafa to Pos Malaysia FC
  Azlan Zakaria to PBAPP FC
  Razlan Joffri Ali to Release
  Mohizam Shah Dawood Shah to Release
  K. Sivabalan to Release
  K. Linggam to Release
  Mohd Farkhis Fisol to Release
  A. Varathan to ATM FA
  Mohd Rizzat Mohd Nor to Release
  Zulkifli Sulaiman to Release
  Zulhissyam Jamaluddin to PBAPP FC
  Mohd Raimi Mohd Nor to Felda United FC
  Mohd Faizal Mansor to Johor FA
  Shahrudin Yakup to Sabah FA
  Mohd Yusri Abas to Johor FA
  Azrine Efendy Sa'duddin to Betaria FC
  Muhammad Ridzuan Kamis to PDRM FA
  E. Lohindran to Release
  Abdul Rahman Nawarwy to Release
  Raslam Khan Abdul Rashid to Release
  Mohd Zamirul Zamri to Release
  Amir Ikhmal Zuhaimi to Release
  Muhammad Aminul Hakim to Release
  Mohd Firdaus Harun to Release

Terengganu FA

Transfers In

Transfers Out

UiTM FC

Transfers (In)

Transfers (Out)

USM FC

Transfers (In)

Transfers (Out)

  
   

Malaysia
Malaysia
2012
Transfers